Naqshuiyeh (also Romanized as Naqshū’īyeh; also known as Nagshū and Naqshū) is a village in Sarduiyeh Rural District, Sarduiyeh District, Jiroft County, Kerman Province, Iran. At the 2006 census, its population was 132, in 22 families.

References 

Populated places in Jiroft County